Abdallah Dipo Sima (born 17 June 2001) is a Senegalese professional footballer who plays as a forward for Ligue 1 club Angers, on loan from Premier League club Brighton & Hove Albion, and the Senegal national team.

Club career

Early career
Sima was spotted by French club Thonon Évian whilst playing in Senegal for amateur club Medina. In 2020, Sima moved to Czech club MAS Táborsko under the advice of agent Daniel Chrysostome. Sima first came to the attention of Slavia Prague after scoring for Táborsko in a friendly against Viktoria Žižkov. Slavia Prague begun negotiations for the transfer of Sima, who had only been at Táborsko for six months, after he scored twice against Slavia Prague B in a friendly.

Slavia Prague 
On 23 July 2020, Slavia Prague announced the signing of Sima to initially play for the club's B team. After scoring four goals in six games for the B team in the Bohemian Football League, Sima was promoted to the first team, making his debut against 1. FC Slovácko on 26 September 2020. On 5 November 2020, Sima scored his first goal for the club in a 3–2 UEFA Europa League win against Nice. On 20 May 2021, Sima scored the only goal in a 1–0 Czech Cup final win against Viktoria Plzeň. In his first season at the club, Sima scored 11 Czech First League goals, one in the Czech Cup and four in the Europa League, resulting in a tally of 16 goals in 33 appearances in all competitions for Slavia Prague.

Brighton & Hove Albion
On 31 August 2021, Sima joined Premier League side Brighton & Hove Albion for an undisclosed fee on a four-year deal.

Stoke City (loan)
Upon moving to England to join Brighton, Sima was immediately loaned out to Championship side Stoke City for the duration of the 2021–22 season. He made his debut for the club on 15 September 2021, coming on as a 76th minute substitute, replacing Jacob Brown in the 1–1 home draw with Barnsley. Sima was assessed in December with the possibility of returning to his parent club Brighton due to injury setbacks, only making four appearances in all competitions for The Potters.

Angers (loan)
On 13 July 2022, Sima joined Ligue 1 club Angers on a season-long loan.

International career
Sima made his debut for Senegal national team on 26 March 2021 in an AFCON 2021 qualifier against Congo.

Career statistics

Club

International

Honours
Slavia Prague
Czech First League: 2020–21
Czech Cup: 2020–21
Individual
Czech First League Young Player of the Year: 2020–21
Czech First League Player of the Month: December 2021

References

External links 
 
 
 

2001 births
Living people
Footballers from Dakar
Senegalese footballers
Senegal international footballers
Association football forwards
Czech First League players
English Football League players
Bohemian Football League players
Ligue 1 players
SK Slavia Prague players
Brighton & Hove Albion F.C. players
Stoke City F.C. players
Angers SCO players
Senegalese expatriate footballers
Expatriate footballers in the Czech Republic
Expatriate footballers in England
Expatriate footballers in France
Senegalese expatriate sportspeople in the Czech Republic
Senegalese expatriate sportspeople in England
Senegalese expatriate sportspeople in France